Three ships in the United States Navy have been named USS Jarvis for James C. Jarvis.

 The first  was a  launched in 1912, served in World War I and decommissioned in 1919.
 The second  was a  launched in 1937, served in World War II and sank in battle in August 1942.
 The third  was a  launched in 1944, served in World War II and the Korean War. She was transferred to the Spanish Navy in 1960.

United States Navy ship names